Herbert Oskar Meyer (10 February 1875 in Wroclaw – 6 March 1941 in Berlin) was a German jurist and historian.

1875 births
1941 deaths
German male non-fiction writers